The Boston Resolutes were a Negro league baseball team affiliated with the National Colored Base Ball League in 1887. The team had come into play in early May of that year only to run out of money and have to fold on the spot.

The National League issued the Colored League its official benefaction as a minor league under the National Agreement, so as to "protect" the black players from the white teams who did not want them to begin with.

The Colored League, which was looked upon as a real live minor league, had been granted immunity from the baseball's unwritten law of exclusion. The era of the Negro leagues had begun, even though this new league was not successful.

References

Ribowsky, Mark. A Complete History of the Negro Leagues. S.l: Citadel, 2002. Print.
The Complete Book of Baseball's Negro Leagues by John B. Holway (2001) Publisher: Hastings House 

1887 establishments in Massachusetts
1887 disestablishments in Massachusetts
Baseball teams disestablished in 1887
Baseball teams established in 1887
Resolutes
Defunct baseball teams in Massachusetts
Negro league baseball teams